Motolian (Мотольска, Motolska) is a West Polesian dialect spoken in Belarus. Motol and Tyshkavichy are the principal settlements in the area where it is spoken. There are approximately 15,000 daily speakers of Motolian. One of its most well-known speakers is Alyaksandr Valadzko.

See also 
 West Polesian microlanguage
 Surzhyk

References 

Belarusian language
Ukrainian dialects